African butterflyfish may refer to:

 Freshwater butterflyfish, Pantodon bulchhozi, a freshwater bonytongue fish
 Chaetodon dolosus, a saltwater butterflyfish